Gulou District is a district of the city of Xuzhou, Jiangsu province, China. It is named after the drum tower of Xuzhou, which built in 1379 but ruined in 1952 because of falling into disrepair. Gulou was a traditional business district before its expansion.

History 
In 1938, the urban area of Tongshan County, namely the former No. 1 District was separated out to establish Xuzhou City by the Japanese military. KMT retained this administrative division. It was renamed Gulou in 1955. After the Cultural Revolution began, it was renamed Yan'an in 1967, thereafter was restored its former name in 1980. Xuzhou Economic and Technological Development Zone was transferred to Gulou from Tongshan in 2005.

Administrative districts 
In the present, Gulou District has 8 subdistricts and 1 towns.

 Jiuli Subdistrict is merged to other.

References

www.xzqh.org 

County-level divisions of Jiangsu
Administrative divisions of Xuzhou